Vranas or Branas is a surname attested from the Byzantine and post-Byzantine period, still used in Greece and other Balkan countries.

In the Byzantine period the family of Vranas became notable from the 11th century till the end of the Empire. According to some historians the family was of Slavonic descent, but according to others of Greek origin.

Notable people in history with this surname include the following:

 Marianos Vranas, general-rebel against Emperor Vasilios II and Protospatharios under Emperor Constantine IX Monomachos (11th century).
 Michael Vranas and, Byzantine general under emperor Manuel I Komnenos (12th century).
Alexios Branas, son of Michael, who decisively defeated the Normans at the Battle of Demetritzes, near Serres, in 1185.
Theodore Branas son of Alexios, Byzantine archon, then Lord of Adrianople and Caesar in the service of the Latin Empire of Constantinople, and also the third husband of empress Anna/Agnes of Francia.
 Georgios Vranas, Byzantine general under emperor Manuel I Komnenos (12th century). Participated in the Byzantine wars against the Hungarians (1164–1168).
 Demetrios Vranas, Byzantine admiral and army officer, brother of Georgios Vranas (12th century). He was injured and captured during the Hungarian wars (1164–1168).
 Nikolaos Vranas, Byzantine general of the 11th century, mentioned by Anna Komnene in the Alexiad.
 Ioannes Vranas, Byzantine general under emperor Andronikos I Komnenos (12th century).
 Vranas or Vranillos or Brana Conte or Hamza (?-1463), balkanian army officer under sultan Murad II. Son of Stanisha Castrioti, was converted to Muslim with the name "Hamza". In 1443 after the battle of Niš fled with George Kastrioti-Skanderbeg to the united Christian army and converted to Christianity taking the name "Vranas".
 Georgios Vranas, Athenian bishop of the 15th century, member of the famous Byzantine House of Vranas. He became Bishop of Dromore and later Bishop of Elphin in Ireland.
 Cortesios Vranas, Greek Unitan priest and author of the 16th century. He authored De Graecae et Latinae missae consensu (1603) and four epigrams to Alessandro Farnese (cardinal).
 Lamprinos Vranas, (? - 1905), he fought in the Macedonian Wars during the last years of the Ottoman Empire, against the Bulgarians.
 
The name is also common in modern Greece. Notable contemporary persons bearing this surname include:
Andreas Vranas (1870–1935), painter
Sperantza Vrana (1926 or 1932–2009), actress
Russos Vranas, author and journalist.
Giorgos Vranas, Cretan folk musician.
Charles Branas, American epidemiologist

In the village of Pappados, Lesvos, there is the Museum - Olive Press Vranas, established in 1887 by Vranas Nikolaou, which has been bought over by the "Archipelagos" company, restored and it currently operates as a museum of olive oil processing.

There are many derivatives of the name produced by various prefixes and suffixes, such as Vranakis, Vranopoulos, Papavranas etc. in Greek and Vranic, Vranof etc. in Slavonic languages. Notable Greek persons with derivatives of the name Vranas are:
  (1900–1980), member of the Greek Parliament and Minister
  (1921–1993) philologist and historian specializing in the history of Epirus, author of many history books and articles, member of the Academy of Athens
 Epameinondas Vranopoulos, 20th-century historian, archaeologist and teacher of history, author of history books.

Etymology of the surname
There are four theories about the etymology of this word and, most probably, the surname is a blend of more than one of them.

 “Quilt-maker”: The word «» originates from «», a kind of traditional quilt in Thrace.
 “Wound/Burn Scar”: The word «» relates to a Sanskrit root and refers to “wound” or (with a second compound) to “burn scar”. The only problem with this theory is that no similar types have been found in any other Indo-European languages, raising the question (this does not, however, constitute a reason for dismissing the theory) of how one linguistic form survived in two so distant languages. If this theory holds water, then it is most probably the oldest creation of a word that leads to the family name.
 “Black/Crow”: The word "vranas" is related to an Indo-European root that means "black bird" or "crow" (Baltic: latv: vārna and lith: varna, Celtic: wel: frân and Slavic: pol: wrona, Serb: vrana, slavmac: Врана (vrana), Slovak: vrana, sloven: vrana, Czech: vrána and more distant cognates in the other Slavic languages) and an ancient Thracian root that points to "black" – the common origin of “vranas” and “black”/”crow” was mentioned by historian Sp. Asdrahas and, leading to the explanation that then the name Vranas was attributed as a nickname in the old times to very dark-skinned people. However, for reasons that not easily explainable, in some words the -λ- transforms into -ρ- (-r-) into the root of the word creating a second form (e.g.,  &  (brother),  &  (saltiness),  &  (come)) a phenomenon which might be explained by the fact that in the syllabographic Linear Script B the syllables 'la' & 'ra', 'le' & 're', 'li' & 'ri', 'lo' & 'ro' and 'lu' & 'ru' were spelt by a common symbol for each pair. Therefore, the "intermediate" form could have a second form which in its expanded variant would have the root  (as demonstrated by the genitive , the noun  ink) and the aforementioned Latvian cognate. The expanded form  possibly relates with bruno (ital: for brown-coloured) and brawn (germ: brown). There is also a further hypothesis that the first intermediate type ties in with the Slavic “cerno”/“cierno” (black – consider Cerno More: Black Sea and Chernobyl: (etym) Black Leaf) through the transformation of the labial -w-/-v- to the -g-/-k-/-c- (consider the cognate pairs: who <-> qui, war <-> guerre, win <-> ganger, Wales <-> Gallia, ward <-> guard) …
 Historical Interpretation: The Vranas surname is reminiscent to the Ouranos surname. This makes prominent Byzantine general Nikephoros Ouranos the oldest known possible member of the Vranas/Vranos/Uranos family (fl. c. 980 – c. 1010). A rich Byzantine nobleman by the name of Victor(as) Ouranos (Latin: Uranus) moved to Italy (possibly to Venice or Naples) where, with time, his name was compacted and altered (Victoras Ouranos > V.Ouranos > Vuranos > Vuran, or Uranus > Uran > Vran). The only evidence located as yet (Oct '11) on this is the two variants of the name of Vrana Konti or Kont Uran Altisferi (? - 1458), an Albanian counsellor and general of Skanderbeg originating from Naples, Italy and a reference to a certain  - count Ouranos (Ouranokontis), again originating from Naples and attached to Skanderbeg - therefore, most probably the same person.

See also 
Vrána
Vrana (disambiguation)
Kastrioti family

References
 

Greek-language surnames